Capsulimonas is a Gram-negative, non-spore-forming, aerobic and non-motile genus of bacteria from the family of Capsulimonadaceae with one known species (Capsulimonas corticalis). Capsulimonas corticalis has been isolated from the surface of a beech (Fagus crenata)

References

Bacteria
Bacteria genera
Monotypic bacteria genera
Taxa described in 2019